Lexon, also known as the Burris-Brockmeyer Farm, is a historic home located at Centreville, Queen Anne's County, Maryland.  It was constructed in the third quarter of the 18th century.  It is a two-story brick house with a pitched gable roof, center passage single pile plan.  Federal and Greek Revival interior decorative detailing result from changes in the first half of the 19th century.

It was listed on the National Register of Historic Places in 1990.

References

External links
, including photo from 1989, at Maryland Historical Trust

Houses on the National Register of Historic Places in Maryland
Houses in Queen Anne's County, Maryland
Federal architecture in Maryland
Greek Revival houses in Maryland
Houses completed in 1760
National Register of Historic Places in Queen Anne's County, Maryland